Mayfield, also known as Mayfield Fund, is a US-based venture capital firm that focuses on early-stage to growth-stage investments in enterprise and consumer technology companies. Founded in 1969 and based in Menlo Park, California, it is one of Silicon Valley's oldest venture capital firms.

History 
The firm was founded in 1969 by venture capitalist Thomas J. Davis, Jr. and Wally Davis (no relation).  Thomas Davis Jr. had earlier founded venture capital firm Davis & Rock with fellow investor Arthur Rock, with funding from several founders of Fairchild Semiconductor. William F. Miller, a former vice president and provost at Stanford University, was an early investor.

In 2009 and 2010, Mayfield fully funded marketing automation software company Marketo's series C and D rounds, and benefited when the company went public in 2013.

In June 2011, Mayfield invested in field SaaS software startup ServiceMax. In September, Mayfield invested in Zimride's Series A funding round, a predecessor to ride hailing service Lyft.  Also in 2011, Navin Chaddha took over as managing partner of Mayfield.

In April 2012, Mayfield invested $12M in ad-tech startup Moat, which was acquired by infotech company Oracle in 2017. In late 2012, Mayfield benefited from its investment in SolarCity when the solar energy company went public.

In 2013, the firm relocated to its current office on Silicon Valley's Sand Hill Road, in Menlo Park.

In April 2016, the firm closed two new funds totaling up to $525 million: Mayfield XV, a fund focused on early-stage companies, and Mayfield Select, designed for later-stage investing.

In June 2019, Mayfield was among several companies that participated in a $200M funding round for data center management company Fungible.

In 2022, Navin Chaddha was named to the Midas List as the number 5 venture capitalist of the year.

The firm is headquartered on Sand Hill Road in Menlo Park, California.

Philanthropy 
Mayfield is a sponsor of the Mayfield Fellows Program at Stanford University. The program offers university students in-depth training and experience in high-tech entrepreneurship.

References

External links
company website

Venture capital firms of the United States
Financial services companies based in California
Companies based in Menlo Park, California
Financial services companies established in 1969
1969 establishments in California